Jeanne Woodford is the Executive Director of Death Penalty Focus.  Previously, she served as the Undersecretary and Director of the California Department of Corrections and Rehabilitation (CDCR) and Warden of San Quentin State Prison, where she oversaw four executions.

Career
Woodford began her career as a California correctional officer in 1978 at San Quentin State Prison. She was appointed Warden of San Quentin State Prison by Governor Davis in 1999.  She developed and implemented programs for prisoners including The Success Dorm, the first reentry program in a California prison.  She also served as Chief Deputy Warden and Associate Warden at San Quentin State Prison. The New York Times profiled Woodford for her unorthodox approach as warden of San Quentin.

In 2004, Woodford was appointed by Governor Arnold Schwarzenegger as the Undersecretary of the California Department of Corrections and Rehabilitation.

As of 2010 she was a Senior Fellow at the Berkeley Center for Criminal Justice and teaches in Stanford University’s Continuing Studies Program and will be teaching at Hastings Law School.

References

Living people
San Quentin State Prison wardens
Year of birth missing (living people)